In 2012, the Campeonato Brasileiro Série D, the fourth division of the Brazilian League, was contested for the fourth time.
Forty clubs competed, four of which eventually qualified for the Campeonato Brasileiro Série C to be contested in 2013.

Competition format
The 40 teams were divided in eight groups of 5, playing in a double round-robin format. The two best ranked in each group at the end of 10 rounds qualified for the second stage, which was played in home-and-away system. Winners advanced to the third stage. These quarterfinal winners were promoted to the Série C 2013. According to the playoff structure, one team from each "mini-tournament" was promoted.

Participating teams

Notes:
 Acre: Atlético Acreano replaced Rio Branco-AC.
 Amapá:Santos-AP replaced Trem.
 Goias:Associação Atlética Aparecidense replaced Itumbiara.
 Pará: Remo replaced Cametá Sport Club.
 Rio Grande do Sul: Cerâmica replaced Veranópolis Esporte Clube, Novo Hamburgo, São José (PA), Pelotas and Lajeadense.
 Rio de Janeiro:Volta Redonda replaced Resende. 
 Santa Catarina:Concórdia replaced Brusque and Metropolitano. Concórdia qualified as last placed team.
 Tocantins: 
All Tocantins-based teams withdrew. Since Tocantins was  already allocated a berth in Group 5 the berth passed on to Goias. No Goias-based team wanted the berth so it passed on to the Federal District.

First stage

Group 1 (AC-AM-PA-RO-RR)

Group 2 (AP-MA-MT-PI-TO)

1 Three points deducted for use of irregular player.

Group 3 (CE-PB-PE-RN)

Group 4 (AL-BA-PB-SE)

Group 5 (DF-GO-MS)

Group 6 (ES-MG-RJ)

Group 7 (PR-RS-SC-SP)

Group 8 (PR-RS-SC-SP)

Final Stage

* Promoted to 2013 Série C.

References

2012
4